David Friedman (born September 25, 1970), known professionally as David Benioff, is an American writer, director and producer. Along with his collaborator D. B. Weiss, he is best known as co-creator and showrunner of Game of Thrones (2011–2019), the HBO adaptation of George R. R. Martin's series of books A Song of Ice and Fire. He also wrote 25th Hour (2002), Troy (2004), City of Thieves (2008) and co-wrote X-Men Origins: Wolverine (2009).

Early life
Benioff was born David Friedman in New York City, the youngest of three children in a Jewish family with ancestral roots in Austria, Romania, Germany, Poland and Russia. He is the son of Barbara (née Benioff) and Stephen Friedman, a former head of Goldman Sachs. He has two older sisters, Suzy and Caroline, and grew up in Manhattan, first in Peter Cooper Village, then on 86th Street where he spent most of his childhood, before eventually moving near the U.N. headquarters when he was 16.

Benioff is an alumnus of Collegiate School and Dartmouth College. At Dartmouth he was a member of Phi Delta Alpha Fraternity and the Sphinx Senior Society. After graduating in 1992, he had a number of jobs: for a time as a club bouncer in San Francisco, and as a high school English teacher at Poly Prep in Brooklyn for two years, where he served as the school's wrestling coach.

Benioff became interested in an academic career and went to Trinity College Dublin in 1995, for a one-year program to study Irish literature. In Dublin he met D. B. Weiss, who later became his collaborator. Benioff wrote a thesis on Samuel Beckett at Trinity College, but decided against a career in academia. He worked as a radio DJ in Moose, Wyoming, for a year—mostly as a side job that he accepted mainly to spend a year in the countryside at a writer's retreat. He then applied to join the University of California, Irvine's creative writing program after reading The Mysteries of Pittsburgh by Michael Chabon (an alumnus there), and received a Master of Fine Arts degree in creative writing there in 1999.

In 2001, People magazine included Benioff on its list of America's Top 50 Most Eligible Bachelors.

As an adult, he began using the pen name Jacqueline Benioff when his first novel was published in 2001. Benioff is his mother's maiden name. He explained that he did this to avoid confusion with other writers named David. For legal purposes, his copyright filings from the 2010s onward list him as "David Benioff Friedman".

Career

Writing career
Benioff spent two years writing his first published novel, The 25th Hour, originally titled Fireman Down, and completed the book as his thesis for his master's degree at Irvine. He was asked to adapt the book into a screenplay after Tobey Maguire read a preliminary trade copy and became interested in making a film of the book. The film adaptation, 25th Hour, starring Edward Norton, was directed by Spike Lee. In 2004 Benioff published a collection of short stories, When the Nines Roll Over (And Other Stories).

He drafted a screenplay of the mythological epic Troy (2004), for which Warner Bros. pictures paid him $2.5 million. He also wrote the script for the psychological thriller Stay (2005), directed by Marc Forster and starring Ewan McGregor and Naomi Watts. His screenplay for The Kite Runner (2007), adapted from the novel of the same name, marked his second collaboration with Forster.

Benioff was hired in 2004 to write the screenplay for the X-Men spin-off X-Men Origins: Wolverine (2009). He based his script on Barry Windsor-Smith's "Weapon X" story, Chris Claremont and Frank Miller's 1982 limited series on the character, as well as the 2001 limited series Origin. Hugh Jackman collaborated on the script, which he wanted to be more of a character piece than the previous X-Men films. Fox later hired Skip Woods to revise and rewrite Benioff's script. Benioff had aimed for a "darker and a bit more brutal" story, writing it with an R rating in mind, but acknowledged the film's final tone would rest with the producers and director.

In 2006, Benioff became interested in adapting George R.R. Martin's novel series A Song of Ice and Fire, and began working with Weiss on a proposed television series, Game of Thrones. The pilot, "Winter Is Coming", was put into development by HBO in 2007 and the series greenlit in 2010. Benioff and Weiss acted as the show's executive producers, showrunners, and writers. It began airing on HBO in 2011. Benioff and Weiss had previously worked together on a script for a horror film titled The Headmaster, but it was never made.

In October 2007, Universal Pictures hired Benioff to write an adapted screenplay of the Charles R. Cross biography of Kurt Cobain, but the screenplay was not used.

In 2008, Benioff's second novel, City of Thieves, was published.

On April 10, 2014, Benioff announced he and Weiss had taken on their first feature film project to write, produce, and direct Dirty White Boys, based on a novel by Stephen Hunter. 21st Century Fox greenlit pre-production on the movie even though at the time, both producers had significant contractual obligations for other projects. Though it was assumed development on Dirty White Boys  would proceed slowly, promotion for the film not only began slow but stopped altogether. According to Kasey Moore, it has been years since anyone once known to be involved with Dirty White Boys, has given an update on the project's status.

On July 19, 2017, Benioff announced that he and Weiss would produce another HBO series, Confederate, after the final season of Game of Thrones. Benioff and Weiss said, "We have discussed Confederate for years, originally as a concept for a feature film, but our experience on Thrones has convinced us that no one provides a bigger, better storytelling canvas than HBO." The announcement of Confederate met with public animosity and as of August 2019 (when Benioff's and Weiss's deal with Netflix was announced) is not moving forward.

On February 6, 2018, Disney announced that Benioff and Weiss would write and produce a new series of Star Wars films after the final season of Game of Thrones ended in 2019.

Towards the end of the final season of Game of Thrones, a petition to HBO was started on Change.org. It called Benioff and Weiss "woefully incompetent writers" and demanded "competent writers" to remake the eighth season of Game of Thrones in a manner "that makes sense". The petition eventually amassed over 1.5 million signatures. In the Chicago Sun Times, Richard Roeper, wrote that the backlash to the eighth season was so great that he doubted he had "ever seen the level of fan (and to a lesser degree, critical) vitriol leveled at" Game of Thrones.

In early August 2019, Benioff and Weiss negotiated an exclusive multi-year film and television deal with Netflix worth $200 million. Due to their commitments to Netflix, Benioff and Weiss exited their contract to produce Star Wars films for Disney and Lucasfilm.

In September 2020, it was announced that Benioff, Weiss and Alexander Woo will write and executive produce a Netflix series based on The Three-Body Problem trilogy.

Directing career
Benioff and Weiss together directed two episodes of Game of Thrones, flipping a coin to decide who would get the credit on the show. Benioff was given the credit for season 3 episode 3, "Walk of Punishment", while Weiss was credited with season 4 episode 1, "Two Swords". Benioff and Weiss co-directed the series finale.

Benioff's and Weiss's first project on Netflix was to direct the stand-up comedy special Leslie Jones: Time Machine.

Personal life
On September 30, 2006, Benioff married actress Amanda Peet in a traditional Jewish ceremony in New York City. They have three children. The family divides their time between homes in Manhattan and Beverly Hills. He is the cousin of software entrepreneur Marc Benioff.

Bibliography

Filmography

Film

Television

Awards and nominations

Primetime Emmy Award

Writers Guild of America Awards

Other awards

See also

 List of awards and nominations received by Game of Thrones

References

External links

 
 

1970 births
21st-century American Jews
21st-century American male writers
21st-century American novelists
21st-century American screenwriters
Alumni of Trinity College Dublin
American dramatists and playwrights
American fantasy writers
American male dramatists and playwrights
American male novelists
American male screenwriters
American male television writers
American people of Austrian-Jewish descent
American people of Polish-Jewish descent
American people of Romanian-Jewish descent
American people of Russian-Jewish descent
American television writers
American television directors
Collegiate School (New York) alumni
Dartmouth College alumni
Hugo Award-winning writers
Jewish American dramatists and playwrights
Jewish American screenwriters
Living people
Novelists from New York (state)
Primetime Emmy Award winners
Screenwriters from New York (state)
Screenwriters from California
Showrunners
Television producers from California
Television producers from New York City
University of California, Irvine alumni
Writers from Manhattan